North Carolina Highway 78 (NC 78) is a primary state highway in the U.S. state of North Carolina.  The highway connects the Tramway community with Sanford's Jonesboro Heights neighborhood.

Route description
NC 78 is a  two-lane highway, traversing from US 1/US 15/US 501 in Tramway, to US 421 Business/NC 42/NC 87 in Jonesboro Heights. The routing provides a southern bypass of downtown Sanford.

History
Established in late 1940 as a renumbering of NC 93, NC 78 went from US 1/US 15/US 501 in Tramway, to US 421 in Jonesboro (today Jonesboro Heights). In 1961, NC 78 was rerouted from its terminus at Main Street and Lee Street (now Lee Avenue), to Woodland Avenue and Lee Street (today Horner Boulevard), in Sanford.  By the late 1960s, NC 78 was rerouted again to its current terminus with Horner Boulevard.

Originally, the first NC 78 existed from 1934-1940, traversing from NC 79 in Gibson to US 74 near Hamlet. Around 1938, it was rerouted from Grace Chapel Road to US 74. In 1940, it was renumbered as NC 381, which was synched with SC 381 in South Carolina.

Major intersections

References

External links

NCRoads.com: N.C. 78

078
Transportation in Lee County, North Carolina